Kazakhstan competed at the 2022 Winter Olympics in Beijing, China, from 4 to 20 February 2022.

On January 21, 2022, speed skater Yekaterina Aidova and short track speed skater Abzal Azhgaliyev were named as the country's flagbearer during the opening ceremony. Meanwhile Azhgaliev was also the flagbearer during the closing ceremony.

Competitors
The following is the list of number of competitors participating at the Games per sport/discipline.

Alpine skiing

By meeting the basic qualification standards Kazakhstan qualified one male and one female alpine skier.

Biathlon

Based on their Nations Cup rankings in the 2020–21 Biathlon World Cup and 2021–22 Biathlon World Cup, Kazakhstan has qualified a team of 2 men and 1 women.

Cross-country skiing

Kazakhstan qualified two male and five female cross-country skiers.

Men

Women

Sprint
Men

Women

Freestyle skiing

Aerials
Men

Women

Mixed

Moguls
Men

Women

Nordic combined

Short track speed skating

Kazakhstan has qualified three male and one female short track speed skater in the individual races. They received one additional female quota to allow them to participate in the mixed relay.

Mixed

Ski jumping 

Men

Speed skating

Mass start

References

Nations at the 2022 Winter Olympics
2022
2022 in Kazakhstani sport